Talismania may refer to:

Talismania (video game)
Talismania (fish)